Abel Matutes y Juan (born 31 October 1941) is a Spanish politician who served as Spain's Minister of Foreign Affairs from 6 May 1996 to 2000.  Matutes was born in Ibiza on 31 October 1941 and his early political life was in that region. He was Mayor of Ibiza in 1970 and 1971 and became Senator for Ibiza and Formentera in 1977. In 1982 Matutes left the Senate and became a member of the Congress of Deputies the lower house of the Spanish Parliament, representing the Balearic Islands until 1985.

In 1986, Matutes became a member of the Commission of the European Community (the Delors Commission), where he was in charge of the departments of Credit and Investment, Financial Engineering and Policy for Small and Medium Enterprises, North–South relations, Mediterranean Policy, and Relations with Latin America and Asia. In 1993 his brief changed to Transportation, Energy and the Supply Agency for Euratom.

He was a member of the European Parliament and spokesman for the Partido Popular at the European Parliament from 1994 onwards. As a Founder Chairman of the Balaerics' "Unió Liberal" Party. He was also deputy chairman of Alianza Popular and is currently a member of the Executive Committee of the Partido Popular.

Outside politics Matutes is married and a father of four children. He holds a degree in Law and Economics and has been a professor of Public Finance, and is also a member of the Economics and Finance Academy. He is Emeritus professor at the University of Santiago de Chile and of the Complutense University of Madrid a member of the Honor Committee of the Royal Institute of European Studies, an honorary member of the Filipino Academy of Spanish Language. As a business man, he has been involved in tourism, aviation, biotechnology and banking companies, and is Deputy chairman of the Ibiza and Formentera Tourism Employers Organisation.

References 
Basic biographical information from NATO who's who. Note that this article is dated 8 September 2002 – the above information may be out of date...
Biography at Spanish Congress site

|-

1941 births
Living people
People from Ibiza
Spanish European Commissioners
People's Party (Spain) politicians
Members of the 2nd Congress of Deputies (Spain)
Members of the Senate of Spain
Complutense University of Madrid alumni
Foreign ministers of Spain
European Commissioners 1985–1988
Recipients of the Medal of the Oriental Republic of Uruguay